A stylite ( 'pillar dweller', derived from  'pillar' and ) or pillar-saint is a type of Christian ascetic who lives on pillars, preaching, fasting and praying. Stylites believe that the mortification of their bodies would help ensure the salvation of their souls. Stylites were common in the early days of the Byzantine Empire. The first known stylite was Simeon Stylites the Elder who climbed a pillar in Syria in 423 and remained there until his death 37 years later.

Ascetic precedents
Palladius of Galatia tells of Epidius, a hermit in Palestine who dwelt in a mountaintop cave for twenty-five years until his death. St. Gregory of Nazianzus speaks of a solitary who stood upright for many years together, absorbed in contemplation, without ever lying down. Theodoret claimed that he had seen a hermit who had passed ten years in a tub suspended in midair from poles.

Simeon Stylites and his contemporaries

In 423 Simeon Stylites the Elder took up his abode on the top of a pillar. Critics have recalled a passage in Lucian (De Syria Dea, chapters 28 and 29) which speaks of a high column at Hierapolis Bambyce to the top of which a man ascended twice a year and spent a week in converse with the gods, but according to Herbert Thurston, scholars think it unlikely that Simeon had derived any suggestion from this pagan custom, which had died out before his time.

In any case Simeon had a continuous series of imitators, particularly in Syria and Palestine. Daniel the Stylite may have been the first of these, for he had been a disciple of Simeon and began his rigorous way of life shortly after his master died. Daniel was a Syrian by birth but he established himself near Constantinople, where he was visited by both the Emperor Leo and the Emperor Zeno. Simeon the Younger, like his namesake, lived near Antioch; he died in 596, and had for a contemporary a hardly less famous Stylite, Saint Alypius, whose pillar had been erected near Hadrianopolis in Paphlagonia. In the mythology, Alypius, after standing upright for 53 years, found his feet no longer able to support him, but instead of descending from his pillar lay down on his side and spent the remaining fourteen years of his life in that position. Roger Collins, in his Early Medieval Europe, tells that, in some cases, two or more pillar saints of differing theological viewpoints could find themselves within calling distance of each other and would argue with one another from their columns.

Other stylites

Daniel the Stylite (c. 409–493) lived on his pillar for 33 years after being blessed by and receiving the cowl of St. Simeon the Stylite.

There were many others besides these who were not so famous, and even female stylites are known to have existed. One or two isolated attempts seem to have been made to introduce this form of asceticism into the West, but it met with little favour. Wulflaich was a Lombard deacon who, according to Gregory of Tours, chose to live as a stylite in the diocese of Trier during the episcopate of Magneric (before 587) and the reign of King Childebert II (576–596).

In the East, cases were found as late as the 12th century; in the Russian Orthodox Church, the practice continued until 1461 and among the Ruthenians even later. For the majority of the pillar hermits the extreme austerity of the lives of the Simeons and of Alypius was somewhat mitigated. Upon the summit of some of the columns a tiny hut was erected as a shelter against sun and rain, and other hermits of the same class among the Miaphysites lived inside a hollow pillar rather than upon it. Nonetheless, the life was one of extraordinary endurance and privation.

In recent centuries this form of monastic asceticism has become virtually extinct. However, in modern-day Georgia, Maxime Qavtaradze, a monk of the Orthodox Church, has lived on top of Katskhi Pillar for 20 years, coming down only twice a week. This pillar is a natural rock formation jutting upward from the ground to a height of approximately one hundred and forty feet. Evidence of use by stylites as late as the 15th century has been found on the top of the rock. With the aid of local villagers and the National Agency for Cultural Heritage Preservation of Georgia, Qavtaradze restored the 1,200-year-old monastic chapel at the top of the rock. A film documentary on the project was completed in 2013.

Popular culture
The Vertigo stunt performed by David Blaine on 22 March 2002 was in part inspired by the Pillar-Saints, as he declared in the TV documentary about this stunt.
A song named "Stylitis" ("Stylite") was written by the Greek singer-songwriter Thanasis Papakonstantinou in 1998.

Fiction

 In Herman Melville's Moby-Dick the narrator calls St. Stylites a "dauntless stander-of-mast-heads" who "literally died at his post".
 In Mark Twain's A Connecticut Yankee in King Arthur's Court, the title character encounters a stylite who prays by metania and uses the pedal motion to sew shirts described as "St. Stylites".
 Umberto Eco's Baudolino temporarily becomes a stylite towards the end of the book.
 Luis Buñuel's Simón del desierto (Simon of the Desert, 1965) is a humorous film about the life of a stylite.
 In Terry Pratchett's Small Gods, a book from the Discworld series, a character named St. Ungulant lives on top of a pole.
 In the episode Souvenirs of the TV series M*A*S*H, Cpl. Klinger sets a pole sitting record.
 In Anatole France's Thaïs, Paphnuce, on his path to damnation, becomes a stylite, but unwittingly falls to temptation. 
 In Ace Ventura: When Nature Calls, Pole-Standing was a rite of passage for a native tribe.
 A stylite-type figure is featured in the first two episodes of the second season of the HBO series The Leftovers.
 In Two for Joy, the second book in Mary Reed and Eric Mayer's John, the Lord Chamberlain series of historical mystery novels set in 6th-century Constantinople, three stylites in a row spontaneously combust during a lightning storm leaving John the Lord Chamberlain suspecting foul play.
 In Douglas Adams's Mostly Harmless, Arthur Dent travels to a planet of prophets where he encounters an old man who lives on platforms on top of very high poles.

See also
 Pole sitting
 Sole Satisfier

References

Sources
 
 The Life of Saint Simeon Stylites: A Translation of the Syriac in Bedjan’s Acta Martyrum et Sanctorum, Frederick Lent, translator 1915. Reprinted 2009. Evolution Publishing, 
 Last of the Stylites

 
Christian saints
Christian asceticism
Christianity in late antiquity
Christianity in the Middle Ages
Eastern Christian monasticism
Hermits